The 2000 Thailand Masters was a professional ranking snooker tournament that took place between 3–11 March 2000 at the Riverside Montien Hotel in Bangkok, Thailand.

Mark Williams retained the title by winning in the final 9–5 against Stephen Hendry.


Main draw

References

2000 in snooker